The Intel Open Source license is identical to the BSD license with the following section added:

The extra section does not add to the terms of the license, rather it reminds users of U.S. export laws. As such the IOSL is functionally identical to the BSD license, and so is GPL compatible (i.e., software distributed under the IOSL can be relicensed as GPL, and so can be included in GPL software).

Intel has voluntarily retracted the license from the OSI list of open source licenses to prevent license proliferation and ceased to use or recommend this license.

See also
GNU General Public License (GPL)
BSD license
List of software licenses

External links
Text of license

References

Free and open-source software licenses
Permissive software licenses